Dongyue Temple may refer to several Taoist/folk religious temples dedicated to the Great Deity of the Eastern Peak, that is Mount Tai:

Dongyue miao 东岳庙 (Beijing), Beijing Dongyue Temple
Dongyue guan 东岳观 (Zhejiang, Pingyang) 
Dongyue guan 东岳观 (Zhejiang, Rui'an County) 
Dongyue miao 东岳庙 (Jiangsu, Huai'an) 
Dongyue miao 东岳庙 (Shandong)
Jiexiu Dongyue miao 介休东岳庙, Jiexiu
Wanrong Dongyue miao 万荣东岳庙, Wanrong, Shanxi

Folk religious temples in China
Taoist temples in China